Walter McFadden, Jr. (born January 21, 1987) is a former American football cornerback. He was selected by the Oakland Raiders in the fifth round (138th overall) of the 2010 NFL Draft. He played college football at Auburn and high school football at Ely High School in Pompano Beach, Florida.

Professional career

Oakland Raiders
He was drafted by Oakland Raiders in the fifth round (138th overall) of the 2010 NFL Draft. He was released by the Raiders on September 3, 2011.

Jacksonville Jaguars
On October 18, 2011, he was signed to the Jacksonville Jaguars practice squad.

Cincinnati Bengals
On November 15, 2011, he signed to the Cincinnati Bengals practice squad. On November 22, 2011, he was released by the Bengals after seven days being signed.

Pittsburgh Steelers
On January 20, 2012, McFadden was signed by the Pittsburgh Steelers.
He was released August 27, 2012, and was re-signed to the practice squad on December 26, 2012.

Personal life
He is the younger brother of NFL cornerback Bryant McFadden and cousin of Patrick Peterson.
He married his longtime college girlfriend Brandi Means in July 2012.

References

External links

Auburn Tigers bio 

1987 births
Living people
Sportspeople from Hollywood, Florida
Players of American football from Florida
American football cornerbacks
Auburn Tigers football players
Oakland Raiders players
Jacksonville Jaguars players
Cincinnati Bengals players
Pittsburgh Steelers players
Blanche Ely High School alumni